Amphilius is a genus of catfishes of the family Amphiliidae.

Amphilius catfish have fairly lengthened bodies, with short, depressed, and broad heads. They have three pairs of fringed barbels. The eyes, small and located dorsally, are very distant from each other, and are without a free edge. The caudal fin is forked or emarginated. Unlike species of Paramphilius, the snout is greater than half of the snout length, the adipose fin is not confluent with the caudal fin in adult specimens, and the anal fin has seven or fewer branched rays.

Species
There are currently 34 recognized species in this genus:
 Amphilius atesuensis Boulenger, 1904
 Amphilius athiensis A. W. Thomson & Page, 2010
 Amphilius brevis Boulenger, 1902
 Amphilius caudosignatus P. H. Skelton, 2007
 Amphilius chalei Seegers, 2008
 Amphilius crassus A. W. Thomson & Hilber, 2015 
 Amphilius cryptobullatus P. H. Skelton, 1986
 Amphilius dimonikensis P. H. Skelton, 2007
 Amphilius frieli A. W. Thomson & Page, 2015 
 Amphilius grandis Boulenger, 1905
 Amphilius jacksonii Boulenger, 1912 (Marbled mountain catfish)
 Amphilius kakrimensis Teugels, P. H. Skelton & Lévêque, 1987
 Amphilius kivuensis Pellegrin, 1933
 Amphilius korupi P. H. Skelton, 2007
 Amphilius krefftii Boulenger, 1911
 Amphilius lamani Lönnberg & Rendahl (de), 1920
 Amphilius lampei Pietschmann, 1913
 Amphilius laticaudatus P. H. Skelton, 1984 (Broadtail mountain catfish)
 Amphilius lentiginosus Trewavas, 1936
 Amphilius longirostris (Boulenger, 1901)
 Amphilius lujani A. W. Thomson & Page, 2015 
 Amphilius maesii Boulenger, 1919
 Amphilius mamonekenensis P. H. Skelton, 2007
 Amphilius natalensis Boulenger, 1917 (Natal mountain catfish)
 Amphilius nigricaudatus Pellegrin, 1909 
 Amphilius opisthophthalmus Boulenger, 1919
 Amphilius pedunculus A. W. Thomson & Page, 2015  
 Amphilius platychir (Günther, 1864) (Mountain barbel)
 Amphilius pulcher Pellegrin, 1929
 Amphilius rheophilus Daget, 1959
 Amphilius ruziziensis  A. W. Thomson & Page, 2015  
 Amphilius uranoscopus (Pfeffer, 1889) (Stargazer mountain catfish)
 Amphilius zairensis P. H. Skelton, 1986

References

 
Amphiliidae
Fish of Africa
Catfish genera
Taxa named by Albert Günther
Freshwater fish genera
Taxonomy articles created by Polbot